Prince Faisal bin Fahd Stadium (formerly ) is a multi-purpose stadium in Riyadh, Saudi Arabia, designed by architect Michael KC Cheah. It is currently used mostly for football matches. Named after Prince Faisal bin Fahd bin Abdulaziz al-Saud, the stadium has a capacity of 22,500 people. Al-Hilal, Al Nassr and Al-Shabab play their matches in this stadium. In 1972, It hosted the opening ceremony for the Arabian Gulf Cup. In the 2011-2012 it became one of the first stadiums in the Kingdom to use electronic ticketing for the Saudi Football League.

International football matches

References

Football venues in Saudi Arabia
Multi-purpose stadiums in Saudi Arabia
Venues of the 2034 Asian Games
Asian Games athletics venues